Clark ministry may refer to:

 21st Canadian Ministry, the Canadian government led by Joe Clark from 1979 to 1980
 Christy Clark ministry, the British Columbia government led by Christy Clark from 2011 to 2017
 Glen Clark ministry, the British Columbia government led by Glen Clark from 1996 to 1999